Claire Francis Moore (born 28 October 2003) is an Australian cricketer who plays as a right-handed batter for the New South Wales Breakers in the Women's National Cricket League (WNCL). She made her professional debut in the first match of the 2021–22 WBBL season for Sydney Sixers against Melbourne Stars, but did not bat or bowl.

International career
In December 2022, Moore was selected in the Australia Under-19 squad for the 2023 ICC Under-19 Women's T20 World Cup.

References

External links

2003 births
Living people
Cricketers from New South Wales
Australian women cricketers
New South Wales Breakers cricketers
Sydney Sixers (WBBL) cricketers